Drysdalia is a genus of snakes, commonly known as crowned snakes, belonging to the  family Elapidae. The three species in this genus are venomous snakes, but not considered deadly.

Geographic range
Species of the genus Drysdalia are endemic to parts of southern and eastern Australia.

Species
Three species are recognized as being valid.

Drysdalia coronoides  – white-lipped snake
Drysdalia mastersii  – Masters' snake
Drysdalia rhodogaster  – mustard-bellied snake

Etymology
The generic name, Drysdalia, is in honour of Australian artist George Russell Drysdale.

The specific name, mastersii, is in honour English-born Australian zoologist George Masters.

Taxonomy
The species formerly known as Drysdalia coronata , commonly known as the crowned snake, was assigned to the genus Elapognathus , by Keogh et al. in 2000. Its current correct scientific name is Elapognathus coronatus .

Description
Crowned snakes are small snakes, averaging about 50 cm (20 inches) in total length (including tail) but can be as small as 18 cm (7 inches). They are normally brown in colour.

Habitat
Crowned snakes inhabit woodlands, swamps, and heathland.

Diet
Drysdalia feed on frogs and lizards.

References

External links
Drysdalia in Australian Fauna Directory

Further reading
Cogger HG (2014). Reptiles and Amphibians of Australia, Seventh Edition. Clayton, Victoria, Australia: CSIRO Publishing. xxx + 1,033 pp. .
Keogh JS, Scott IA, Scanlon JD (2000). "Molecullar phylogeny of viviparous Australian elapid snakes: affinities of Echiopus atriceps (Storr, 1980) and Drysdalia coronata (Schlegel, 1837) with description of a new genus". Journal of Zoology 252: 317–326. ("Elapognathus coronata [sic, ex errore]", new combination).
Swan, Gerry (1995). A Photographic Guide to Snakes and other Reptiles of Australia. Sydney: New Holland. 144 pp. 
Wilson, Steve; Swan, Gerry (2013). A Compete Guide to Reptiles of Australia, Fourth Edition. Sydney: New Holland Publishers. 522 pp. .
Worrell E (1961). "Herpetological Name Changes". West Australian Naturalist 8: 18–27. (Drysdalia, new genus).

 
Snakes of Australia
Snake genera
Taxa named by Eric Worrell